Football Club Pars Jonoubi Jam (Bashgah-e Futbal-e Pars Jinubi), commonly known as Pars Jonoubi Jam, is an Iranian football club based in Jam, Bushehr. They were promoted to the Persian Gulf Pro League in 2016–17 season.

The football team plays their home games at the Shohada Stadium which has a seating capacity of 15,000. The club is owned and supported by the PSEEZ (Pars Special Energy Economic Zone) and is named after the South Pars Gas Field.

History

Establishment
In 2007 FC Pars Junubi Jam Bushehr was founded by the PSEEZ (Pars Special Energy Economic Zone). In 2010 Pars Jonoubi Jam were allowed to play in Iran Football's 2nd Division. In 2015–16 Iran Football's 2nd Division Pars Jonoubi Jam finished second in their group and were placed in the promotion Play-off against Naft va Gaz Gachsaran. Pars Jonoubi Jam won 4–0 on aggregate and were promoted to the Azadegan League.

Azadegan League
On 7 August 2016, Pars Junubi Jam played its first ever Azadegan League match against Mes Rafsanjan. They won the game 1–0. On 24 April 2017 Pars Jam defeated Esteghlal Ahvaz 2–1 and were crowned Azadegan League champions and were promoted to the Persian Gulf Pro League for the 2017–18 season.

Persian Gulf Pro League
In September 2017, Pars shocked Iran after leading the league after six rounds following their surprise 2–0 win against Iranian giants Esteghlal.

Supporters
Pars Junubi Jam is the highest supported team in Jam County. Many workers from the Pars Special Energy Economic Zone are supporting the club.

Stadium

The home venue of Pars Junubi Jam is the Shohada Stadium in Jam, Bushehr, Iran with a 10,000 seating capacity. It is owned by the PSEEZ (Pars Special Energy Economic Zone).

Season-by-Season

The table below shows the achievements of the club in various competitions.

Honours

Domestic competitions

League
Azadegan League:
 Winners (1): 2016–17

Players

First team squad

For recent transfers, see List of Iranian football transfers winter 2018–19''.

References

 
Football clubs in Iran
Association football clubs established in 2007
2007 establishments in Iran